Ministry of Rural Development may refer to:

 Ministry of Rural Development (Cambodia)
 Ministry of Rural Development (Hungary)
 Ministry of Rural Development (India)
 Ministry of Rural Development (Malaysia)